Justin S. Kruger is an American social psychologist and professor at New York University Stern School of Business.

Education 
Kruger received his BS in Psychology from Santa Clara University in 1993 (spending his junior year at Durham University, England), and received his PhD in Social Psychology from Cornell University in 1999.

Research 
Kruger is known for co-authoring a 1999 study with David Dunning. This study showed that people who performed in the lowest at certain tasks, such as judging humor, grammar, and logic, significantly overestimated how good they were at these tasks. This study has since given rise to what is known as the Dunning–Kruger effect, a form of cognitive bias where persons with low ability in a particular task experience a sense of illusory superiority. The study also found that people who performed slightly above average at identifying how funny a given joke was tended to be the most accurate at assessing how good they were at the assigned tasks, and that those who performed the best tended to think they performed only slightly above average.

References 

Living people
American social psychologists
American people of German descent
Cornell University alumni
Year of birth missing (living people)
Santa Clara University alumni
New York University Stern School of Business faculty
20th-century American psychologists
21st-century American psychologists
Alumni of Durham University